The 2015–16 Biathlon World Cup – World Cup 2 was held in Hochfilzen, Austria, from 11 December until 13 December 2015.

Schedule of events

Medal winners

Men

Women

Achievements

 Best performance for all time

 First World Cup race

References 

2015–16 Biathlon World Cup
Biathlon World Cup - World Cup 2
December 2015 sports events in Europe
Biathlon competitions in Austria
Sport in Tyrol (state)